White Cross Orphanage is a child caring agency in San Juan, Philippines that provides temporary shelter for children, who are 0–6 years old. Accredited by the Department of Social Welfare and Development (DSWD), it gives refuge to children of unwed mothers, indigent families, tuberculosis patients, mentally or physically-incapacitated parents, prisoners, or victims of incest or rape. These children are provided with medical assistance, educational care, and financial support to help them in their early years.

History

Early Beginnings
In the early 20th century when there was an outbreak of tuberculosis (TB) in the Philippines, the orphanage was established to shelter the children of the TB patients of the Quezon Institute. It was founded by Victoria Lopez de Araneta in 1936. Its founding board members include Mercedes McMicking, Conrado Dayrit, Emmanuel J. Dymek, Teodoro Evangelista, Mrs. Carl Hess, Manuel Mañosa, Vincente Marasigan, Paulino Miranda Sampedro, Gonzalo Puyat, Juan Tuason, and Soledad Zulueta.

Through the leadership of de Araneta, the board purchased the land in Santolan, San Juan, which is four-hectare lot, where the structure would be built. One of its recognized supporters at that time was President Manuel Quezon and in his honor the orphanage was also known as the Quezon Preventorium. He signed a bill that allowed a portion of horse race revenues to be channeled to the orphanage.

In 1938, two years after its initial operations, the institution was run under the care of the Daughters of Charity of Saint Vincent de Paul who took in 20 children of TB patients as its wards. The nuns managed the orphanage until they turned it over to the current board in 2004.

World War II
On 20 June 1944, during the time of World War II, the Japanese took over the orphanage and the nuns transferred the children to Welfareville in Mandaluyong for safety. Although the board gave Sr. Consuelo Muró, then overseer of White Cross, the authority to close down the institution, she continued the mission and fed the children in its temporary home in Welfareville. When the war ended and through the help of the American liberation forces, they restored White Cross and the children and the staff returned to San Juan in 1946.

Architecture

The services of architect Pablo Antonio, who was later recognized as National Artist for Architecture, was obtained to design White Cross, which was aimed to be a fresh-air shelter for the children of TB patients. The building was an Art Deco design with its façade shaped like a large white cross. The bas-relief of children at play that was designed by Italian sculptor Francesco Monti softened the linear and sharp structure of the façade.

Among Antonio's works, which included the Far Eastern University (FEU), Ideal Garden, Orchid Garden Hotel, and Syquia Apartments, only the Manila Polo Club and White Cross remain as the stalwarts because most of his designs have been demolished or in a state of decline.

References 

Orphanages in the Philippines
Buildings and structures in San Juan, Metro Manila
Health in Metro Manila
Buildings and structures completed in 1938
1938 establishments in the Philippines
Works of National Artists of the Philippines
Art Deco architecture in the Philippines